Shaanxi Circuit or Shaanxi Province was one of the major circuits during the Song dynasty. In 1072 (first year of Yuanfeng, era name in Shenzong regin) it was split into Qinfeng Circuit (秦凤路二路) and Yongxingjun Circuit (永宁军路).

Its administrative area corresponds to roughly the modern provinces of central and southern Shaanxi, southern Ningxia, eastern Gansu, western Henan and southwestern Shanxi.

References
 

Circuits of the Song dynasty
Former circuits in Shaanxi
Former circuits in Ningxia
Former circuits in Gansu
Former circuits in Henan
Former circuits in Shanxi